Alf Harbitz (1 January 1880 – 23 December 1964) was a Norwegian journalist, writer, critic and translator.

He was born in Flekkefjord. During his career he worked in newspapers such as Verdens Gang, Aftenposten, Morgenbladet and Drammens Tidende. He also published several novels, plays and works of prose. He was a member of the board of the Riksmål Society from 1929 to 1938, and chaired the organization from 1936 to 1937.

References

External links
 

1880 births
1964 deaths
Norwegian literary critics
People from Flekkefjord
20th-century Norwegian novelists
20th-century Norwegian dramatists and playwrights
20th-century Norwegian translators
Norwegian male dramatists and playwrights
Norwegian male novelists
20th-century Norwegian journalists